SuperCoolNothing v2.0 is a compilation album by 16volt, released on July 1, 2002 by Dark City Music. The album comes with a bonus disk of remixes and demos. Several tracks of the album are featured in the video game Primal. Two-thousand copies of the album were re-pressed by Dark City Music with new cover art and the first 100 copies signed by the band.

Reception

Don Kline of allmusic gave SuperCoolNothing v2.0 four our of five stars and said "with its gut-wrenching lyrics, incessant percussion, and grinding guitars, it's unfortunate that Super Cool Nothing remains one of the more largely unnoticed industrial releases of the late '90s." IGN credited the second disc as being better than the first and claimed "industrial/goth exuberance aside, there were a few tracks on supercoolnothing that burrowed themselves into my sonic consciousness."

Track listing

Personnel
Adapted from the SuperCoolNothing v2.0 liner notes.

16volt
 Mike Peoples – guitar, bass guitar, production
 Eric Powell – lead vocals, guitar, programming, engineering, production

Addition performers
 Joseph Bishara – programming, production, engineering
 Krayge Tyler – guitar
 Chris Vrenna – drums

Production and design
 Michael Bodine – cover art, design
 Andrew Garver – mastering
 Dave Hancock – engineering
 Bill Kennedy – production, engineering, mixing
 Rafael Serrano – engineering
 Steve Tushar – engineering

Release history

References

External links 
 
 SuperCoolNothing v2.0 at Bandcamp
 

2002 compilation albums
16volt albums